Vallicode (pronounced valli-koad) is a village in Pathanamthitta district in Kerala, India. It is situated at about 7 km from the district headquarters of Pathanamthitta at south-east direction.

Geography
The northern and southern sides of the village are protected by tall hills and a valley emerges in between the hills.  The valley, decorated by tall trees and green vegetation descends to the paddy fields at the centre, which is watered by the stream originating from the hills, flowing through the heart of the village, like a life-line and reaches the Achankovil River. Vallicode is a village with temples, valleys, and rivers. It is home to thrikovil temple and home to many malayalee families.

Post Office
The postal pincode for vallicode is 689648. Do note - Vallicode is not the same as Vallicode-Kottayam though both are pretty adjacent.

Access

One can reach Vallicode from Pathanamthitta via Kodumthara - Vazhamuttom - Thazhoorkkadavu Bridge. It is only 6 km from Pathanamthitta City.

Alternatively, one can also arrive via Kaipattoor Kadav Junction on the Adoor - Pathanamthitta route.

Temples 

Thrikkovil Sree Padmanabha Swami Kshetram 
This temple is supposedly the second of its kind in Kerala, the first being the temple in Thiruvananthapuram.

Thrippara Shiva Kshetram 
A temple situated near the river-bed with Lord Shiva as the presiding deity.

Thazhoor Bhagavathi Kshetram 
Another Devi temple by the Achankovil River known for their annual Kumba Bharani festival and Kolam thullal dedicated to goddess Kali.

Mampilalil Ayyappa Kshetram 
This is an Ayyappa Temple on the south side of the  Valllicode.

Puthiyedathukavu Devi Kshetram 
Another Devi (Kali) temple in Vallicode

Ammankovil Bhagavathy Temple 
This Devi Temple situate the river-bed of Achankovil and near the Bridge of Kaipattoor.

sreekandapuram mahadevar temple
Another temple in Vallicode( lord shiva and parvathi devi's temple)

See also 

 Pathanamthitta
 Kaipattoor
 Pandalam
 Vazhamuttom
 Omallur
 Thazhoor Bhagavathy Kshetram(temple)
 Chandanapally

References

External links 

 Vallicode Panchayat - Local Body Institution
 Vallicode location on Map
 Vallicode village details

Villages in Pathanamthitta district